Hapoel HaKochav Tel Aviv was a football club in the Shabazi neighborhood of Tel Aviv, which operated during the British mandate of Palestine. The club played one season in Liga Bet prior to the Israeli Declaration of Independence, as well as playing in the 1937 and 1938 editions of the Palestine Cup.

After the 1948 Arab–Israeli War, another club, Maccabi Shmuel Tel Aviv was established in the Shabazi neighborhood, named after Shmuel Yefet, a former board member of Hakochav Tel Aviv.

References

Defunct football clubs in Israel
Association football clubs established in 1936
1936 establishments in Mandatory Palestine
Football clubs in Tel Aviv
Hapoel football clubs
Association football clubs disestablished in 1938